Cape Woolamai is a town and headland at the south eastern tip of Phillip Island in Victoria, Australia.   It is home to Cape Woolamai State Faunal Reserve and the Phillip Island Airport. Cape Woolamai contains a subdivision also called Cape Woolamai (formerly known as Woolamai Waters and Woolamai Waters West).

History
The cape was named by George Bass (but spelt "Wollamai") when he kicked it on his whaleboat voyage in early 1798.  Wollamai is the snapper fish (Pagrus auratus) in the language of the Eora Aboriginal people of Port Jackson, where the fish is found.  Bass, who had learnt some of the Sydney language from the Eora leader Bennelong, thought the headland resembled the head of that fish.

In 1826, during the establishment of Fort Dumaresq, near Rhyll, coal was reported to have been found in the vicinity of the Cape.

The area was purchased from the government in 1868 by John Cleeland, sea captain, publican and owner of the Melbourne Cup winner of 1875. He then built Wollomai House and ran merino sheep from New South Wales. In 1910 his son, John Blake Cleeland, noticed the sand was shifting due to erosion, so he planted rows of Marram grass, still evident today.

In 1959,  of farmland was sold and subdivided into housing estates for beach shacks and holiday makers. It was then named Woolamai Waters and Woolamai Waters West, and later renamed Cape Woolamai. Cape Woolamai had a Post Office from 1970 to roughly 1974 which was open only during summer. A Woolamai Post Office was open from 1911 until 1974. The roads were sealed in the late 1980s and beach shacks gradually turned into more substantial houses.  Today Cape Woolamai has a world-renowned surf beach, Woolamai Beach Surf Life Saving Club, and a popular Safety Beach.

Environment
The headland contains remnant vegetation and wildlife such as an important breeding colony of the short-tailed shearwater, also called the Australian muttonbird. Volunteer groups such as the Cape Woolamai Coast Action Group conduct regular improvement and maintenance works including weed control and revegetation.  It lies within the Phillip Island Important Bird Area, identified as such by BirdLife International because of its importance in supporting significant populations of little penguins, short-tailed shearwaters and Pacific gulls.

Gallery

References

External links
Bass Coast Shire Website
Downloadable map of Cape Woolamai
Official Profile at Phillip Island Nature Parks
Profile at Domain.com
Profile at VisitPhillipIsland.com

Phillip Island
Woolamai
Important Bird Areas of Victoria (Australia)
Towns in Victoria (Australia)
Bass Coast Shire